Haputale is a town of Badulla District in the Uva Province, Sri Lanka, governed by an Urban Council. The elevation is 1431 m (4695 ft) above the sea level. The area has a rich bio-diversity dense with numerous varieties of flora and fauna. Haputale is surrounded by hills covered with cloud forests and tea plantations. The town has a cooler climate than its surroundings, due to its elevation. The Haputale pass allows views across the Southern plains of Sri Lanka. The South-West boundary of Uva basin is marked by the Haputale mountain ridges, which continue on to Horton Plains and Adam's Peak to the west. CNN in 2010 named Haputale as one of Asia's most overlooked destinations.

Transport

Roads 
 A16 highway (Beragala-Hali Ela) a part of the Colombo-Badulla road. (Route 99)
 B147 (Haputale-Dambetenna) road.
 Haputale-Welimada road. (Via Boralanda)
 Haputale-Diyatalawa road. (via Yahalabedda)
 Haputale-Wellawaya road. (Via Beragala and Koslanda)

Rail 

Haputale railway station is the 69th station on the Main Line. The station opened on 19 June 1893, following the extension of the main line from Nanu Oya railway station to Haputale.

Population 
 Source

Places of interest 

Horton Plains National Park Via Boralanda
Adisham Bungalow
Lipton's Seat
St. Andrew's Church
Diyaluma Falls
Bambarakanda Falls
Soragune Devalaya
Haldummulla town
Beragala Gap
Dambetenna
Idalgashinna
Thangamale Sanctuary (Protected areas of Sri Lanka)

Adisham Bungalow 
Adisham Bungalow is a nineteenth-century British period building, which was modelled on Leeds Castle in Kent, England. Sir Thomas Villiers, a distinguished British resident in Sri Lanka in the early 20th century, used it as his country house. Later it became a Benedictine monastery. The Thangamale Bird Sanctuary is located next to the bungalow.

Lipton’s Seat 

The Lipton’s Seat is located at Dambetenna in the Haputale Mountain region. This place was a favourite look-outpoint  for Sir Thomas Lipton. The point has a fabulous view over Uva, Southern, Sabaragamuwa, Central and Eastern provinces.

Climate
Köppen-Geiger climate classification system classifies its climate as subtropical highland (Cfb).

Government institutions
 Police Station
 Government Hospital
 Haputale Divisional Education Office
 Main Post Office
 Urban Council Offices

Members of Parliament 
The constituency has been represented in Parliament by:
J. A. Rambukpota 1947–1952 
Wilfred A. Ratwatte 1952–1956 
W. P. G. Ariyadasa 1956–1977
W. J. M. Lokubandara 1977–1988

See also 
Towns in Uva
History of Uva Province

References

External links 

 Travel Uva  
Haputale Information Website

Towns in Badulla District